Prominea porrecta is a moth of the family Erebidae first described by Max Saalmüller in 1880. It is found on the African Indian Ocean islands of Madagascar, Réunion and Mauritius.

It has a wing length of about 16–17 mm and a wingspan around 33 mm.

References

External links
"Prominea porrecta (Saalmüller, 1880) -Cirrhochrista etiennei". Image on right from Flicker. Archived from the original January 23, 2013.

Calpinae
Moths described in 1880
Moths of Madagascar
Moths of Mauritius
Moths of Réunion